Orlann Ombissa-Dzangue (born 26 May 1991) is a French sprinter who specializes in the 100 metres. As a relay runner she won a silver medal at the 2011 European U23 Championships, and competed without reaching the final at the 2017 World Championships in Athletics. Her personal best time is 11.06 seconds, achieved in July 2018 in Albi.

Personal life
Born in France, Ombizza-Dzangue is of Gabonese descent.

References

External links
 

1991 births
Living people
Sportspeople from Sens
French female sprinters
World Athletics Championships athletes for France
Athletes (track and field) at the 2018 Mediterranean Games
Mediterranean Games medalists in athletics
Mediterranean Games gold medalists for France
Mediterranean Games gold medalists in athletics
Athletes (track and field) at the 2020 Summer Olympics
Olympic athletes of France
French sportspeople of Gabonese descent